Grozești is a commune in Mehedinți County, Oltenia, Romania. It is composed of four villages: Cârceni, Grozești, Păsărani and Șușița.

References

Communes in Mehedinți County
Localities in Oltenia